Dustin Acres is a census-designated place (CDP) in Kern County, California, United States. The population was 652 at the 2010 census, up from 585 at the 2000 census.

Geography

Demographics

2010
At the 2010 census Dustin Acres had a population of 652. The racial makeup of Dustin Acres was 539 (82.7%) White, 4 (0.6%) African American, 9 (1.4%) Native American, 1 (0.2%) Asian, 0 (0.0%) Pacific Islander, 71 (10.9%) from other races, and 28 (4.3%) from two or more races. Hispanic or Latino of any race were 129 people (19.8%).

The whole population lived in households, no one lived in non-institutionalized group quarters and no one was institutionalized.

There were 224 households, 83 (37.1%) had children under the age of 18 living in them, 139 (62.1%) were opposite-sex married couples living together, 22 (9.8%) had a female householder with no husband present, 10 (4.5%) had a male householder with no wife present.  There were 15 (6.7%) unmarried opposite-sex partnerships, and 3 (1.3%) same-sex married couples or partnerships. 38 households (17.0%) were one person and 11 (4.9%) had someone living alone who was 65 or older. The average household size was 2.91.  There were 171 families (76.3% of households); the average family size was 3.26.

The age distribution was 175 people (26.8%) under the age of 18, 56 people (8.6%) aged 18 to 24, 169 people (25.9%) aged 25 to 44, 170 people (26.1%) aged 45 to 64, and 82 people (12.6%) who were 65 or older.  The median age was 37.6 years. For every 100 females, there were 107.6 males.  For every 100 females age 18 and over, there were 115.8 males.

There were 252 housing units at an average density of 68.5 per square mile, of the occupied units 187 (83.5%) were owner-occupied and 37 (16.5%) were rented. The homeowner vacancy rate was 4.6%; the rental vacancy rate was 5.1%.  549 people (84.2% of the population) lived in owner-occupied housing units and 103 people (15.8%) lived in rental housing units.

2000
At the 2000 census there were 585 people, 199 households, and 161 families living in the CDP. The racial makeup of the CDP was 85.13% White, 0.17% Black or African American, 3.42% Native American, 8.21% from other races, and 3.08% from two or more races.  10.26% of the population were Hispanic or Latino of any race.
Of the 199 households 42.2% had children under the age of 18 living with them, 66.8% were married couples living together, 7.0% had a female householder with no husband present, and 18.6% were non-families. 15.6% of households were one person and 6.0% were one person aged 65 or older.  The average household size was 2.94 and the average family size was 3.25.

The age distribution was 32.8% under the age of 18, 7.4% from 18 to 24, 30.9% from 25 to 44, 21.2% from 45 to 64, and 7.7% 65 or older.  The median age was 33 years. For every 100 females, there were 107.4 males.  For every 100 females age 18 and over, there were 104.7 males.

The median household income was $50,203 and the median family income  was $51,689. Males had a median income of $51,149 versus $30,795 for females. The per capita income for the CDP was $23,929.  About 4.7% of families and 7.0% of the population were below the poverty line, including 9.3% of those under age 18 and 14.9% of those age 65 or over.

References

Census-designated places in Kern County, California
Census-designated places in California